Mouser may refer to:

 A domestic cat used for hunting rodents, e.g. a farm cat or ship's cat
 Chief Mouser to the Cabinet Office, the official resident cat of the Prime Minister of the United Kingdom
 Mouser Electronics, an online distributor of electronic components
 A fictional type of rat catching robots from the Teenage Mutant Ninja Turtles series
 A boss in the video game Super Mario Bros. 2 and recurring villain for cartoon segments of The Super Mario Bros. Super Show!

People 
 Grant Mouser (disambiguation), list of people with the name
 Mary Mouser (born 1996), American actress
 Michelle Mouser (born 1973), American beauty queen

Places

United States 
 Mouser, Oklahoma
 Mouser Place, New Mexico

See also 
 Fafhrd and the Gray Mouser
 Mauser